Cheta Emba (born July 16, 1993) is an American rugby union player.

Biography 
Emba attended Maggie L. Walker Governor's School, she was a goalkeeper on the soccer team and a forward on the basketball team. She played soccer and began her rugby career in her junior year at Harvard University where she majored in molecular cellular biology with a minor in Spanish.

In her senior year she was selected for the Eagles squad to the 2015 Women's Rugby Super Series in Canada.

Emba was selected to represent the United States at the 2022 Rugby World Cup Sevens in Cape Town.

References

External links
 Cheta Emba Harvard soccer profile
 Cheta Emba at USA Rugby
 
 
 
 
 

1993 births
Living people
American female rugby union players
United States women's international rugby union players
Harvard College alumni
Maggie L. Walker Governor's School for Government and International Studies alumni
Pan American Games medalists in rugby sevens
Pan American Games silver medalists for the United States
Rugby sevens players at the 2019 Pan American Games
American female rugby sevens players
Medalists at the 2019 Pan American Games
Rugby sevens players at the 2020 Summer Olympics
Olympic rugby sevens players of the United States
American women's soccer players
Soccer players from Richmond, Virginia
Women's association football goalkeepers
Harvard Crimson women's soccer players
Harvard Crimson rugby players